Haft Cheshmeh-ye Jahanshah (also Romanized as Haft Cheshmeh-ye Jahānshāh; also known as Jahānshāh) is a village in Gowavar Rural District, Govar District, Gilan-e Gharb County, Kermanshah Province, Iran. At the 2006 census, its population was 170, in 38 families.

References 

Populated places in Gilan-e Gharb County